The Hungarian Workers' Party is a communist party in Hungary led by Gyula Thürmer. Established after the fall of the communist Hungarian People's Republic, the party has yet to win a seat in the Hungarian parliament. Until May 2009, it was a member of the Party of the European Left. It was formed from, and considers itself the successor to, the former ruling Hungarian Socialist Workers' Party.

History 
The party was established as the Hungarian Socialist Workers' Party on 17 December 1989 as a successor party of the Hungarian Socialist Workers' Party (MSZMP) by a small group of old MSZMP members who opposed its transformation into the Hungarian Socialist Party (MSZP). Among them was Károly Grósz, the last general secretary of the old MSZMP, who became the new party's acting chairman

In the 1990 elections it received around 3% of the national vote, the largest share for a party that failed to win a seat.

In 1993 the party adopted the name Workers' Party, and in the same year a group of hard-liners broke away to form another Hungarian Socialist Workers' Party. In the 1994 elections, the party won a similar share of the vote, again emerging as the largest party without a seat. Despite increasing its vote share to around 4% in the 1998 elections, the party again remained seatless. In the 2002 elections, the party's vote share fell to around 2%, and for the first time since 1990, not the largest party without parliamentary representation.

On 12 November 2005 it became the Hungarian Communist Workers' Party when a split led to the formation of the Workers' Party of Hungary 2006 led by János Fratanolo. In the 2006 elections the party received less than 0.5% of the national vote, whilst in the 2010 elections, its vote share fell to just 0.1%. On 11 May 2013 the party was renamed again, this time becoming the Hungarian Workers' Party due to a law passed the previous year banning the public use of names associated with "authoritarian regimes of the 20th century." In the 2014 parliamentary election, the party received 0.56% of the votes, again the largest party without parliamentary seats.

On the question of the 2016 migrant quota referendum, the party called for a "no" vote, expressing opposition to what it perceives as "EU aggression" against Hungary.

The Party was on the NO vote side during the 2003 Hungarian European Union membership referendum.

Ideology
The party opposed Hungary joining NATO. In 1996 the party organised a countrywide collection of signatures for a referendum on NATO membership. This HCWP-led referendum drive failed, although another referendum on NATO membership was held in 1997, which resulted in a vote in favour. The party continues to oppose the country's participation in NATO and other military organisations. It campaigns to have all Hungarian forces returned from abroad and to reduce the military budget. The party opposed Hungary's participation in the "democratisation" program that has previously targeted the governments of Serbia and Belarus and strongly opposed NATO campaigns in Yugoslavia against Slobodan Milošević and the 2003 invasion of Iraq.

Other foreign policies are in favour of
a peaceful and just settlement of the Middle East crisis, in favour of the "progressive" Arab countries.
a foreign policy based upon "good relations" with all parts of the world.

Election results

National Assembly

European Parliament

Gallery

Notes

References

External links 
 Party website 
 A szabadság Weekly newspaper of the party
 Baloldali Front Party's youth organization
 Hungarian Workers' Party Facebook
 Hungarian Workers' Party Twitter

1989 establishments in Hungary
Communist parties in Hungary
Eurosceptic parties in Hungary
Party of the European Left former member parties
Political parties established in 1989
Opposition to NATO
Marxist parties in Hungary
Hungarian Socialist Party breakaway groups
International Meeting of Communist and Workers Parties